The 2006 Drake Bulldogs football team represented Drake University as a member of the Pioneer Football League (PFL) during the 2006 NCAA Division I FCS football season. Led by 14th-year head coach Rob Ash, the Bulldogs compiled an overall record of 9–2 with a mark of 6–1 in conference play, placing second in the PFL. The team played its home games at Drake Stadium in Des Moines, Iowa.

The Bulldogs were chosen as a 2006 Sports Network Cup finalist, finishing second to PFL champion San Diego in first-place votes and third in overall votes.

Schedule

References

Drake
Drake Bulldogs football seasons
Drake Bulldogs football